Adriaan Ditvoorst (23 January 1940 – 18 October 1987) was a Dutch film director and screenwriter. He directed nine films between 1965 and 1984. His 1967 film Paranoia was entered into the 17th Berlin International Film Festival.

Selected filmography
 Paranoia (1967)
 Antenna (1969)
 De Mantel der Liefde (1978)
 De Witte Waan (1984)

References

External links

1940 births
1987 deaths
Dutch film directors
Dutch screenwriters
Dutch male screenwriters
People from Bergen op Zoom
20th-century screenwriters
1987 suicides
Suicides by drowning
Suicides in the Netherlands